The Krichim Hydro Power Plant is an active hydro power project in Krichim, Bulgaria. It has 4 individual turbines with a nominal output of around 20 MW which will deliver up to 80 MW of power.

References

Hydroelectric power stations in Bulgaria
Buildings and structures in Plovdiv Province